John George Brandt Jr. (born April 28, 1934) is an American former professional baseball outfielder, who played in the major leagues for the St. Louis Cardinals, New York / San Francisco Giants (–), Baltimore Orioles (–), Philadelphia Phillies (–), and Houston Astros (1967). He was originally signed by the Cardinals as an amateur free agent before the  season.

Brandt made his big league debut on April 21, 1956, against the Milwaukee Braves at Sportsman's Park, then was traded to the New York Giants almost two months later. In a noteworthy rookie season, he posted a .298 batting average, 125 games played, 12 home runs, and 50 runs batted in. In 1959, he won a Gold Glove for his stellar play as the San Francisco Giants' regular left fielder, then was traded to Baltimore, where he would have his most productive years.

He finished ninth in the American League batting race, with a .297 batting average, and he had several career highs, including 153 hits, 516 at bats, 73 runs batted in, 93 runs scored, and a .371 on-base percentage. The Orioles had a great year, winning 95 games and losing only 67.

One of Brandt's most memorable games took place at Baltimore Memorial Stadium, on September 12, 1964. He drove in the only run in a rare battle of complete game one-hitters between Orioles left-hander Frank Bertaina and Kansas City Athletics southpaw Bob Meyer. Teammate Bob Saverine entered the 0–0 game in the bottom of the 8th inning, as a pinch runner for John Orsino, who had doubled. Saverine advanced to third on a Bertaina sacrifice bunt, then scored when Brandt hit a sacrifice fly to right field.

Brandt was traded with Darold Knowles from the Orioles to the Phillies for Jack Baldschun on December 6, 1965. As a Phillie, he was the last player to bat against Sandy Koufax during a regular-season game, striking out for the final out of the 1966 regular season finale. Koufax retired from baseball after the 1966 World Series, starting and losing Game 2 in a four-game sweep captured by the Orioles — the 66-year-old franchise's first world championship.

Brandt career statistics included 1,221 games, 1,020 hits, 112 home runs, 485 runs batted in, 540 runs, a .262 batting average, and a .412 slugging percentage.

References

External links

Jackie Brandt at Baseball Almanac
Jackie Brandt at Astros Daily

1934 births
Living people
American League All-Stars
Ardmore Cardinals players
Baltimore Orioles players
Baseball players from Nebraska
Cocoa Astros players
Columbus Cardinals players
Dallas–Fort Worth Spurs players
Gold Glove Award winners
Houston Astros players
Major League Baseball outfielders
Minor league baseball managers
New York Giants (NL) players
Oklahoma City 89ers players
Omaha Cardinals players
Philadelphia Phillies players
Raleigh-Durham Triangles players
Rochester Red Wings players
St. Louis Cardinals players
San Francisco Giants players
Sportspeople from Omaha, Nebraska